New Wave is the fourth extended play by South Korean boy band Cravity. It was released on September 27, 2022, by Starship Entertainment and distributed by Kakao Entertainment. It was released alongside the music video for lead single "Party Rock".

The album debuted at number one on the South Korean Circle Album Chart with sales of over 183,000 copies.

Background
The EP includes four songs co-written by members Serim and Allen, including "Automatic" and "Colorful", as well as the band's first English-language song, "Boogie Woogie", and the first song self-produced by Woobin, "Colorful".

Promotion
On September 27, Cravity began the EP's promotion with a performance at the Yes24 Live Hall in the Gwangjin District of eastern Seoul, where they also interacted with fans and discussed the EP's creation.

The group's promotions for the song "Party Rock" on music show programs began on Mnet's M Countdown on September 29, 2022. The promotion continued on KBS2's Music Bank on September 30, MBC's Music Core on October 1, and SBS Inkigayo on October 2, capping off the first week of promotions.

Track listing

Charts

Weekly charts

Monthly charts

Year-end charts

References

2022 EPs
Cravity EPs
Korean-language EPs